Koskinas is a village in the municipality of Olympia, Elis, Greece. It is 1.5 km northeast of Olympia.

Populated places in Elis